Jane Dunnewold is an textile artist and author. She had been the president of the Surface Design Association.

Biography
Dunnewold was born in Oberlin, Ohio, United States, North America and currently lives in San Antonio, Texas with her family.

Exhibitions

Solo exhibitions 
 2016: Inspired by The Masters. Visions Art Museum. San Diego, CA.
 2016: Quilt/Not Quilt Fibreworks Gallery. British Columbia, Canada. New Work.
 2013: Lyrical Thread. Radius Gallery. San Antonio, TX.
 2013: Artists Looking At Art. MCNay Art Museum. San Antonio, TX.
 2011: Etudes: A Daily Practice. Hite Institute for Art. University of Louisville. KY. Sacred Planet. Schweinfurth Art Center. Auburn, NY.
 2010: Sacred Planet. Boger Gallery. College of the Ozarks. Point Lookout MO. 
 2010: Intimate Conversations. Festival of Arts. Birmingham UK.
 2007: New Work. Textilkundst. Munich, Germany.
 2005: Disciple of Life. Woven: A Textile Art Space. Philadelphia PA. 2002: ArtCloth. Textile Center. Minneapolis MN.
 2001: Pray without Ceasing. Mendocino College Gallery. Ukiah CA. 
 2001: Homage to the Tao. Jane Sauer Gallery. Santa Fe NM.

Selected Invitational and Juried Exhibitions 
 2016: 2016 Visionmakers. 108 Contemporary. Tulsa. OK.
 2016: The Artist as Maker, Thinker, Feeler. Cade Art Gallery. Anne Arundel Community College. Arnold. MD.
 2016:  Breakout: Quilt Visions. Visions Quilt Museum. San Diego. CA.
 2016: Stories of Migration. Textile Museum. Washington DC.
 2015: Quilt National. Dairy Barn Art Center. Ohio.
 2015: Two by Twenty. Sponsored by Studio Art Quilt Associates. Currently traveling
 internationally. 
 2015: Contemporary Fiber: Breaking Traditions. Lore Degenstein Gallery, Susquehanna University. PA.
 2014: Timeless Meditations. Tubac Art Center. Tubac, AZ. Best of Show.
 2014: International TECHstyle Art Biennial. San Jose Museum of Quilts & Textiles. CA.
 2013: FiberArt International. Pittsburgh Center for the Arts. Pittsburgh, PA. 
 2013: Chautauqua National Juried Exhibition: Crossroads. Richmond, KY. 
 2012: Timeless Meditations. Tubac Art Center. Tubac, AZ. Best of Show. 
 2012: Textiles Today. Durango Arts Center. Durango, CO.
 2011: Green: the Color and the Cause. The Textile Museum. Smithsonian Museums. Washington DC. 2010
 2010: ArtCloth: Engaging New Visions. Fairfield City Museum and Stein Gallery. Sydney, Australia.
 Orange Regional Gallery. New South Wales, Australia.
 Wangaratta Gallery. Victoria, Australia.
 2008: Freedom: The Fiber of Our Nation. Textile Center. Minneapolis MN.
 2007: Unfurled: Expressive Cloth. Robert Hillestad Gallery. University of Nebraska. Curator and exhibitor. Lincoln NE.
 2007: Lush: Art Fabrics. Grimshaw-Gudiwicz Art Gallery. Fall River, MA.
 2007: Art Cloth: Spanning Continents. Houston, Texas. Curator and exhibitor.
 2006: Never Static. Textile Center of Minnesota. Juror and participant.
 2003: Craft 2003. Houston Center for Contemporary Craft. Houston TX. Honorable Mention

Awards
2002: Quilts Japan Prize

Publications
Dunnewold has published several books including:
1996: Complex Cloth: A Comprehensive Guide to Surface Design
2010: Art Cloth: A Guide to Surface Design for FabricArt Cloth: A Guide to Surface Design for Fabric
2016: Creative Strength Training: Prompts, Exercises and Stories to Encourage Artistic Genius, North Light Books.

References

Year of birth missing (living people)
Living people
American textile artists
People from Oberlin, Ohio
American women artists
American women writers
Women textile artists
21st-century American women